Bramley is a surname. Notable people with the surname include:
Arthur Bramley (1929–2021), English footballer
Bart Bramley (born 1948), American bridge player
Charlie Bramley (1870–1916), English footballer
Flora Bramley (1909–1993), English-born American actress
Frank Bramley (1857–1915), English painter
Fred Bramley (1874–1925), British trade unionist
Henry Ramsden Bramley (1833–1917), English clergyman and hymnologist
Joe Bramley (born 1983), New Zealand musician
Maurice Bramley (1898–1975), New Zealand-born Australian cartoonist
Peter Bramley (disambiguation), several people
William Bramley (1928–1985), American actor

See also 
Bramley-Moore

English toponymic surnames
Surnames of British Isles origin